Kororia is a surname of Kenyan origin that may refer to:

Kipyego Kororia (born 1971), Kenyan cross country runner and medallist at the 1987 IAAF World Cross Country Championships
Shem Kororia (born 1972), Kenyan half marathon runner

See also
Korir (disambiguation), a similar Kenyan name

Kenyan names